Estriol sulfate glucuronide, or estriol 3-sulfate 16α-glucuronide, is an endogenous, naturally occurring diconjugated metabolite of estriol. It is generated in the liver from estriol sulfate by UDP-glucuronyltransferase and is eventually excreted in the urine by the kidneys. It occurs in high concentrations during pregnancy along with estriol sulfate and estriol glucuronide, and was a component of the early pharmaceutical estrogens Progynon and Emmenin.

See also
 Catechol estrogen
 Estrogen conjugate
 Lipoidal estrogen

References

External links
 Metabocard for Estriol 3-sulfate 16α-glucuronide (HMDB10356) - Human Metabolome Database

Estriol esters
Estrogens
Glucuronide esters
Human metabolites
Phenol esters
Prodrugs
Sulfate esters